The Bukidnon Provincial Board is the Sangguniang Panlalawigan (provincial legislature) of the Philippine province of Bukidnon.

The members are elected via plurality-at-large voting: the province is divided into three districts, the first and the third sending three members to the provincial board, while the second sends four members; the number of candidates the electorate votes, and the number of winning candidates, depends on the number of members their district sends. The vice governor is the ex officio presiding officer, and only votes to break ties. The vice governor is elected via the plurality voting system province-wide.

The districts used in appropriation of members is coextensive with the legislative districts of Bukidnon.

District apportionment

List of members
An additional three ex officio members are the presidents of the provincial chapters of the Association of Barangay Captains, the Councilors' League, the Sangguniang Kabataan
provincial president; the municipal and city (if applicable) presidents of the Association of Barangay Captains, Councilor's League and Sangguniang Kabataan, shall elect amongst themselves their provincial presidents which shall be their representatives at the board.

Vice Governor (Presiding officer)

1st District

2nd District

3rd District

4th District

Ex officio

Provincial boards in the Philippines
Politics of Bukidnon